W. D. John Seneviratne is a Sri Lankan politician, a member of the Parliament of Sri Lanka and a former government minister.

Born in Kahawatta, Ratnapura, Seneviratne was the son of Welathanthirige Podi Appuhami and Soma Wijesundara. When he was a child his father died, and he was raised by his mother Soma Wijesundara.  He was educated at the Palmadulla Gangkanda Vidyalaya, Taxila Central College, Horana, Aquinas College, and at the Sri Lanka Law College.

At the Sri Lanka Law College, Seneviratne took an active role in the Law Student's movement. This experience helped him in being an active leader of the Sri Lanka Freedom Alliance.

When he first entered mainstream politics in 1977, the Sri Lanka Freedom Alliance was experiencing a severe crisis. During this crisis situation, Seneviratne acted as the chief organizer of the Palmadulla electorate.

Seneviratne first entered the Parliament of the Democratic Socialist Republic of Sri Lanka in 1989. He was appointed Deputy Minister of Education in 1995, and as Labour Minister in 1997. In 2000, he took over the Health Ministry.  He later became the Minister of Justice and Judicial Reforms under the United People's Freedom Alliance Government; he is currently Minister of Power and Energy.

See also
 Cabinet of Sri Lanka

References
 

Living people
Members of the 9th Parliament of Sri Lanka
Members of the 10th Parliament of Sri Lanka
Members of the 11th Parliament of Sri Lanka
Members of the 12th Parliament of Sri Lanka
Members of the 13th Parliament of Sri Lanka
Members of the 14th Parliament of Sri Lanka
Members of the 15th Parliament of Sri Lanka
Members of the 16th Parliament of Sri Lanka
Home affairs ministers of Sri Lanka
Sri Lanka Freedom Party politicians
United People's Freedom Alliance politicians
Sri Lanka Podujana Peramuna politicians
1941 births
People from Ratnapura
Labour ministers of Sri Lanka
Power ministers of Sri Lanka